The 1908 TCU football team represented Texas Christian University (TCU) as an independent during the 1908 college football season. Led by Jesse R. Langley in his first year as head coach, TCU compiled a record of 6–3. They played their home games in Waco, Texas.

Schedule

References

TCU
TCU Horned Frogs football seasons
TCU football